Building BloQs is an open workshop in Enfield, London. A social enterprise, their emphasis is on creating and maintaining space and resources for people to make a living off their craft. The model is in response to rising rental prices and gentrification in London. In 2017, it had 300 professional members, a 10,000 square foot space, and was called a "proof of concept" for a new 55,000 square foot space. That new space will be part of a 200-acre, £6B urban development project called Meridian Water. The £2.7m project will make Building BloQs the biggest Open Workshop in Europe.

, BloQs maintained studios and tools for Metal and Woodworking, cnc milling, laser cutting, and Textiles. Their space also includes an Artist studio and a cafe, and is mostly flexible space.

References

External links
Official Website
Open Workshop Network

Further reading
The Great British Make Off
One BloQs resident's experience of the place

Hackerspaces